Misfortunes the second full-length album by hardcore punk band This Is Hell. It was released on February 19, 2008 through Trustkill Records. After extensive worldwide touring in 2007, the band managed to find time to write and record an album. An earlier version of "Infected" can also be found on the band's prior release Cripplers (EP). An additional track, "Cement Shoes", was found in the leak of the album and is also available on the UK version of the CD release.

Track listing
"Reckless" - 1:59
"Infected" - 2:31
"Disciples" - 4:23
"In Shambles" - 4:26
"Realization: Remorse" - 1:46
"Without Closure" - 1:48
"Remnants" - 3:36
"Resuscitate" - 3:25
"Fearless Vampires" - 2:14
"You Are the Antithesis" - 3:20
"End of an Era" - 3:25
"Memoirs" - 3:43
"Last Days Campaign" - 4:15

Bonus tracks
<li>"Show No Mercy" (Cro-Mags cover) (Vinyl version)
<li>"Cement Shoes"

Personnel
This Is Hell
Travis Reilly - vocals
Rick Jimenez - guitar and vocals
John Moore - bass
Dan Bourke - drums
Chris Reynolds - guitar

Crew vocals
Brian Audley
Dan Terr
Jeff Tiu
Chris Mazella
Brendan Garrone
Andrew Dijorio
Joe Cincotta

References

2008 albums
This Is Hell (band) albums
Trustkill Records albums